Howell Mountain may refer to:
 Howell Mountain, California
 Howell Mountain AVA
 Howell Mountain, a summit of the San Francisco Bay Area

See also
 Mount Howell, a mountain of Ellsworth Land